Ta' Kerċem is an administrative unit of Malta, on the island of Gozo, with a population of 1,938 people as of March 2014.

The village of Ta' Kerċem lies south-west of Victoria, spread between the picturesque Lunzjata Valley, the green hills of Tal-Mixta, Għar Ilma and Ta' Dbieġi, and stretching up to the Pond of Għadira ta' San Rafflu and Xlendi cliffs.

Archaeological discoveries show that the sizeable area of Ta' Kerċem was inhabited as early as the Għar Dalam phase (5000–4500 BC). The Roman Baths and an early Christian cemetery at Għar Gerduf, referred to by Gozitan historian Giovanni Pietro Francesco Agius de Soldanis as Roman Catacombs, are also significant discoveries. However, to date, these historic sites are not accessible to the public.

Ta' Kerċem evolved into a village community in the late Middle Ages, around an ancient chapel dedicated to Pope Gregory the Great built around 1581. The site gained historical importance due to the annual traditional St. Gregory procession from the Matrix church in Rabat (Victoria) to this medieval chapel, upon the saint's feast, namely on 12 March. The chapel was, however, replaced by the present parish church in 1851, which in turn was enlarged later on to its present state between 1906 and 1910. Ta' Kerċem became a distinct parish on 10 March 1885 by Bishop Pietru Pace. The Ta' Kerċem parish church is the only Gozitan church which is jointly dedicated to two saints. As referred earlier, it was traditionally dedicated to Pope Gregory, but, since 17 August 1885, the church was additionally co-dedicated to Our Lady of Perpetual Help. The village celebrates the summerly feast of Our Lady of Perpetual Help every second week of June.

The village of Ta' Kerċem has a population of around 1700 people. Cultural activities include the annual Għadira Fair, which is a popular traditional family fair in the countryside area of Sarraflu. Ta' Kerċem is home to Kerċem Ajax Stadium, one of the biggest stadiums in Gozo. It is mainly used for Gozo Football League Second Division games. The stadium is the home stadium of Kerċem Ajax F.C..

Incorporated within Ta' Kerċem is the hamlet of Santa Luċija, Gozo. Santa Luċija is inhabited by country folk with a few old houses built around an old chapel dedicated to St. Lucy.

In 2018, the former police station in the locality was vacated and put for sale.

Zones in Ta' Kerċem
Fuq il-Blat 
Għajn Abdul 
Għar Ilma 
Iċ-Ċnus 
Ix-Xagħri 
Klula 
Lekx 
Sarraflu 
Ta' Berrini 
Ta' Ċajplu 
Ta' Ġanton 
Ta' Katas 
Ta' Majru 
Ta' Summina
Ta' Xewka 
Ta' Xkura 
Tal-Warda 
Wardija 
Wied il-Ġifna 
Wied tal-Grixti

References

External links

Awarded "EDEN - European Destinations of Excellence" non traditional tourist destination 2008
Images from the picturesque hamlet of Santa Lucija

 
Towns in Malta
Local councils of Malta
Gozo